LRSVM Tamnava is a modular multiple rocket launcher developed by Yugoimport SDPR. Vehicle is based on Kamaz 6560 8x8 truck chassis, but chassis from other manufacturers can also be used.

Development 
The new 122/267mm dual MLRS was revealed by Yugoimport SDPR in 2020 with intended purpose to strengthen the artillery capabilities of the Serbian Armed Forces.

LRSVM 262/122 mm is designed as a modular system. The representation of modularity is the possibility of using launch containers with 262 mm caliber missiles as well as 122 mm Grad missiles. The system is fully automated, equipped with GPS and INS systems, and can operate completely autonomously with the possible execution of programmed combat mission. The system has the ability to accept two spare launchers containers 122 mm. Charging and discharging of the containers is done by a crane that is mounted on a platform. There is also the option of installing reusable launch tubes.

Tamnava's modular containers when combined use 122 and 262mm missiles consisting of 2 launched modules 122mm (24 missiles) and 2 modules 262mm (6 missiles). When it only uses 122mm missiles, this system has 48 missiles at its disposal.

Operators

Future operators 
  – Cypriot National Guard bought one battery of six launchers.
 – at 2021 Partner military fair it was announced that system should enter into service of the Serbian Army in the short-term period.

Potential operators 
  – in 2022 Hellenic Army was presented the MLRS Tamnava as it seeks to replace RM-70s.

See also 

 M-77 Oganj
 T-122 Sakarya
 RM-70
 LRSVM Morava

References 

Rocket artillery
Self-propelled artillery of Serbia
Military Technical Institute Belgrade
Multiple rocket launchers
Modular rocket launchers
Military vehicles introduced in the 2010s